Derr is a surname. Notable people with the surname include:

Allen Derr (1928–2013), American lawyer
A. M. Derr (1903–1970), American politician from Idaho
E.B. Derr (1891 – 1974), American actor
Helen Derr (1918–2011), American journalist
John W. Derr (born 1941), former Maryland State Senator
Kenneth T. Derr, American businessman
Mark Derr, American author
Zac Derr, American football placekicker
Richard Derr (1918–1992), American film and television actor
Jill Mulvay Derr (born 1948), American history professor
Manuela Derr (born 1971), retired East German sprinter

See also
Temple of Derr, Ancient Egyptian temple